The Wolfsnächte Tour 2012 was a European concert tour by German power metal band Powerwolf. Supporting the release of their fourth studio album Blood of the Saints, the tour ran from 9 December 2011 to 21 July 2012, taking place in Germany, Switzerland, Russia, Austria, Belgium, Poland, Croatia, Italy and Czech Republic.

Background 
The tour dates were announced in December 2011. Mystic Prophecy, Stormwarrior and Lonewolf served a series of opening acts for Powerwolf during the tour.

Powerwolf released the Wolfsnächte 2012 Tour EP, a split EP with Mystic Prophecy, Stormwarrior, and Lonewolf. This EP featured a previously unreleased Powerwolf track, "Living on a Nightmare". Copies of this EP were originally distributed along with the purchase of tickets to the tour but since its conclusion, copies have been available in the Powerwolf webstore.

During the tour, Powerwolf also recorded their first live album, Alive in the Night. It contained 10 tracks and was just over 45 minutes in length. It was released with the April 2012 issue of the German edition of Metal Hammer.

Set list 
This setlist is representative of the show on 9 April 2012 in Augsburg, Germany, at the Spectrum Club. It does not represent all dates throughout the tour.

 "Agnus Dei"
 "Sanctified with Dynamite"
 "Prayer in the Dark"
 "Catholic in the Morning... Satanist at Night"
 "We Drink Your Blood"
 "All We Need Is Blood"
 "Dead Boys Don't Cry"
 "Werewolves of Armenia"
 Drum solo
 "Raise Your Fist, Evangelist"
 "Resurrection by Erection"
 "Saturday Satan"
 "Lupus Dei"
 "Opening: Prelude to Purgatory"
 "St. Satan's Day"
 "Kiss of the Cobra King"
 "In Blood We Trust"
 "Wolves Against the World"

Tour dates

Notes

References

External links 
 Official Powerwolf website

2011 concert tours
2012 concert tours
Powerwolf concert tours
Concert tours of Europe
Concert tours of Germany